HC Butel Handball is a handball club based in Skopje, Macedonia. It competes in the Macedonian top flight Super League.

History 
The club is established in August 2017. In their debut they've won the league 1 which is second rank division and they qualified for the Super league competition. In  the season  2018/19 they've finished 4th and managed to qualify for the EHF Cup competition for the first time. HC Butel Skopje riched the round 2 in the debut for EHF competition .

Team
Squad for the 2022–23 season

References

External links 

 РК Бутел Скопје на службеното мрежно место на Ракометната Федерација на Македонија
 РК Бутел Скопје на службеното мрежно место на Европската Ракометна Федерација

Handball clubs in North Macedonia
Sport in Skopje